Proto-Japonic or Proto-Japanese–Ryukyuan is the reconstructed language ancestral to the Japonic language family.
It has been reconstructed by using a combination of internal reconstruction from Old Japanese and by applying the comparative method to Old Japanese (including eastern dialects) and Ryukyuan languages. The major reconstructions of the 20th century were produced by Samuel Elmo Martin and Shirō Hattori.

Background 

The Japonic language family comprises Japanese, spoken in the main islands of Japan; Hachijō, spoken on Hachijō-jima, Aogashima, and the Daitō Islands; and the Ryukyuan languages, spoken in the Ryukyu Islands.
Most scholars believe that Japonic was brought to northern Kyushu from the Korean peninsula around 700 to 300 BC by wet-rice farmers of the Yayoi culture and spread throughout the Japanese archipelago, replacing indigenous languages.
The oldest attested form is Old Japanese, which was recorded using Chinese characters in the 7th and 8th centuries.

Ryukyuan varieties are considered dialects of Japanese in Japan but have little intelligibility with Japanese or even among one another. They are divided into northern and southern groups, corresponding to the physical division of the chain by the 250 km-wide Miyako Strait.
The Shuri dialect of Okinawan is attested since the 16th century.
All Ryukyuan varieties are in danger of extinction.

Since Old Japanese displays several innovations that are not shared with Ryukyuan, the two branches must have separated before the 7th century.
The migration to the Ryukyus from southern Kyushu may have coincided with the rapid expansion of the agricultural Gusuku culture in the 10th and 11th centuries.
After this migration, there was limited influence from mainland Japan until the conquest of the Ryukyu Kingdom by the Satsuma Domain in 1609.

Early reconstructions of the proto-language, culminating in the work of Samuel Martin, were based primarily on internal reconstruction from Old Japanese. Evidence from Japanese dialects and Ryukyuan languages was also used, especially regarding the history of the Japanese pitch accent, but otherwise assuming a secondary role. The complementary approach of comparative reconstruction from the dialects and Ryukyuan has grown in importance since the work of Shirō Hattori in the 1970s.

Phonology 
Proto-Japonic words are generally polysyllabic, with syllables having the form (C)V.

Consonants 

Scholars agree that the Old Japanese voiced consonants b, d, z and g, which never occurred word-initially, are derived from clusters of nasals and voiceless consonants. In most cases, the two consonants were brought together by loss of an intervening vowel. A few words display no evidence for a former vowel, and scholars reconstruct a syllable-final nasal of indeterminate place preceding the voiceless obstruent, as in  > Old Japanese  > Modern Japanese  'grain',  > OJ piza > MJ hiza 'knee'. These nasals are unrelated to the moraic nasal of later forms of Japonic, which derive from contractions or borrowings from other languages such as Middle Chinese.

 Southern Ryukyuan varieties have  corresponding to Old Japanese w, e.g. ba 'I' and bata 'stomach' corresponding to Old Japanese wa and wata. Two dialects spoken around Toyama Bay on the west coast of Honshu also have  corresponding to initial  in other Japanese dialects.
 Yonaguni, at the far end of the Ryukyu island chain, has  in words where Old Japanese has y, e.g. da 'house', du 'hot water' and dama 'mountain' corresponding to Old Japanese ya, yu and yama.
Many authors, including advocates of a genetic relationship with Korean and other northeast-Asian languages, argue that Southern Ryukyuan initial  and Yonaguni  are retentions of Proto-Japonic voiced stops  and  that became  and  elsewhere through a process of lenition. However, many linguists, especially in Japan, prefer the opposite hypothesis, namely that Southern Ryukyuan initial  and Yonaguni  are derived from local innovations in which Proto-Japonic  and  underwent fortition. The case for lenition of - > - is substantially weaker, with the fortition hypothesis supported by Sino-Japonic words with Middle Chinese initials in  also having reflexes of initial  in Yonaguni, such as dasai 'vegetables' from Middle Chinese . An entry in the late-15th-century Korean annals Seongjong Taewang Sillok records the local name of the island of Yonaguni in Idu script as 閏伊是麼, which has the Middle Korean reading zjuni sima, with sima glossed in the text as the Japonic word for 'island'. That is direct evidence of an intermediate stage of the fortition - > - > -, leading to the modern name  'Yonaguni'.

Vowels 
Most authors accept six Proto-Japonic vowels, which are as follows:

In Old Japanese, they were raised to i and u respectively except word-finally. They have also left some traces in eastern Old Japanese dialects and are also found in some early mokkan and in some modern Japanese dialects.

The other vowels of Old Japanese are believed to derive from sequences of Proto-Japonic vowels, with different reflexes in Ryukyuan and Eastern Old Japanese:

In most cases, Proto-Japonic  corresponds to Old Japanese i2. Proto-Japonic  is reconstructed for Old Japanese e2 in the few cases that it alternates with o2 (< ). Some authors propose a high central vowel  to account for these alternations, but there is no evidence for it in Ryukyuan or Eastern Old Japanese. The alternate reflex e2 seems to be limited to specific monosyllabic nominal stems such as se~so2 'back', me2~mo 'seaweed' and ye~yo2 'branch'.

Prosody 
The Japanese pitch accent is usually not recorded in the Old Japanese script. The oldest description of the accent, in the 12th-century dictionary Ruiju Myōgishō, defined accent classes that generally account for correspondences between modern mainland Japanese dialects. However, Ryukyuan languages share a set of accent classes that cut across them. For example, for two-syllable words, the Ruiju Myōgishō defines five accent classes, which are reflected in different ways in the three major accent systems of mainland Japanese, here represented by Kyoto, Tokyo, and Kagoshima. In each case, the pattern of high and low pitches is shown across both syllables and a following neutral particle. Ryukyuan languages, here represented by Kametsu (the prestige variety of the Tokunoshima language), show a three-way division, which partially cuts across the five mainland classes.

In some Ryukyuan dialects, including Shuri, subclass (a) is marked by a long vowel in the first syllable instead of a distinct pitch pattern, which led Hattori to suggest that the original distinction was one of vowel length.

Lexicon

Pronouns 
The form , which may have been borrowed from Koreanic, yielded an ambivalent personal pronoun in Japanese, a second-person pronoun in Northern Ryukyuan, and a reflexive pronoun in Southern Ryukyuan.

The following interrogative pronouns can be reconstructed:
 *ta 'who'
 *n-anu- 'what'
 *entu- 'where' (possibly borrowed from Koreanic)
 *entu-re 'which'
 *etu 'when'
 *e-ka 'how'
 *e-ku 'how many'

The following demonstratives can be reconstructed:
  'this' (proximal)
  'that' (distal)
The mesial demonstratives of Old Japanese (so < ) and Proto-Ryukyuan are unrelated.

Numerals 
Reconstructed Proto-Japonic numerals (1-10) and their reflexes in selected descendants are as follows:

The Proto-Japonic forms for '2', '6' and '8' appear to be derived from the words of which they are doubles by vowel alternation.

References

Works cited

Further reading 

 
 
 

 
Japonic